Presidential elections were held in El Salvador on 25 March 1984, with a second round on 6 May. A new president was elected, together with a vice-president, for a five-year term. The result was a victory for José Napoleón Duarte of the Christian Democratic Party.

The elections were held under military rule amidst high levels of repression and violence, and candidates to the left of Duarte's brand of Christian Democrats were excluded from participating.

Nevertheless, the election was considered the first fair and just one after the 1931 election.

Results

References

Presidential elections in El Salvador
1984 in El Salvador
El Salvador
Election and referendum articles with incomplete results